Jeffrey Robert Hart (born May 5, 1960) is an American professional golfer. He has played on the PGA Tour, Nationwide Tour, and Champions Tour.

Hart was born in Pomona, California. He played college golf at the University of Southern California where he was a two-time All-American.

Hart played on the PGA Tour (1985, 1989–90, 1996–97, 2001, 2005) and Nationwide Tour (1992–93, 1995, 2000, 2002–04, 2006) over a 20-year span. His best finish on the PGA Tour was T-4 at the 1988 Deposit Guaranty Golf Classic. On the Nationwide Tour, he won once, at the 2000 Buy.com Steamtown Classic. He played in the PGA Tour Qualifying Tournament a record 16 times.

After turning 50, he played on the Champions Tour, earning his full card at the 2011 Qualifying School. His best finish is a T-3 at the 2015 Regions Tradition.

Hart is a life member of the Southern California section of the PGA.

Amateur wins
1979 Southern California Amateur

Professional wins (2)

Buy.com Tour wins (1)

Other wins (1)
2019 Southern California PGA Championship

Results in major championships

CUT = missed the halfway cut
Note: Hart never played in the Masters Tournament or The Open Championship.

See also
1984 PGA Tour Qualifying School graduates
1988 PGA Tour Qualifying School graduates
1989 PGA Tour Qualifying School graduates
1995 PGA Tour Qualifying School graduates
1996 PGA Tour Qualifying School graduates
2000 Buy.com Tour graduates
2004 PGA Tour Qualifying School graduates

References

External links

American male golfers
USC Trojans men's golfers
PGA Tour golfers
PGA Tour Champions golfers
Korn Ferry Tour graduates
Golfers from California
Sportspeople from Pomona, California
People from Solana Beach, California
1960 births
Living people